The War of the Spanish Succession was a European great power conflict that took place from 1701 to 1715. The death of childless Charles II of Spain in November 1700 led to a struggle for control of the Spanish Empire between his heirs, Philip of Anjou and Charles of Austria, and their respective supporters, among them Spain, Austria, France, the Dutch Republic, Savoy and Great Britain. Related conflicts include the 1700–1721 Great Northern War, Rákóczi's War of Independence in Hungary, the Camisards revolt in southern France, Queen Anne's War in North America and minor trade wars in India and South America.

Although weakened by over a century of continuous conflict, Spain remained a global power whose territories included the Spanish Netherlands, large parts of Italy, the Philippines, and much of the Americas, which meant its acquisition by either France or Austria potentially threatened the European balance of power. Attempts by Louis XIV of France and William III of England to resolve the issue through diplomacy were rejected by the Spanish and Charles II named Louis' grandson, Philip of Anjou, as his heir. His proclamation as king of an undivided Spanish Empire on 16 November 1700 led to war, with France and Spain on one side and the Grand Alliance on the other.

The French held the advantage in the early stages, but were forced onto the defensive after 1706; however, by 1710 the Allies had failed to make any significant progress, while Bourbon victories in Spain had secured Philip's position as king. When Emperor Joseph I died in 1711, Archduke Charles succeeded his brother as emperor, and the new British government initiated peace talks. Since only British subsidies kept their allies in the war, this resulted in the 1713–15 Peace of Utrecht treaties, followed by the 1714 Treaties of Rastatt and Baden.

Philip was confirmed as King of Spain in return for renouncing the right of himself or his descendants to inherit the French throne; the Spanish Empire remained largely intact, but ceded territories in Italy and the Low Countries to Austria and Savoy. Britain retained Gibraltar and Menorca which it captured during the war, acquired significant trade concessions in the Spanish Americas, and replaced the Dutch as the leading maritime and commercial European power. The Dutch gained a strengthened defence line in what was now the Austrian Netherlands; although they remained a major commercial power, the cost of the war permanently damaged their economy.

France withdrew backing for the exiled Jacobites and recognised the Hanoverians as heirs to the British throne; ensuring a friendly Spain was a major achievement, but left them financially exhausted. The decentralisation of the Holy Roman Empire continued, with Prussia, Bavaria and Saxony increasingly acting as independent states. Combined with victories over the Ottomans, this meant Austria increasingly switched focus to southern Europe.

Background
Charles II of Spain succeeded his father Philip IV at the age of four in 1665. Subject to extended periods of ill-health for much of his life, his death was anticipated almost from birth, and the issue of his successor a matter of diplomatic debate for decades, the two main contenders being Louis XIV of France and Emperor Leopold I. In the 1670 Secret Treaty of Dover, Charles II of England agreed to support the rights of Louis XIV, while the 1689 Grand Alliance committed England and the Dutch Republic to back those of Leopold.

In 1700, the Spanish Empire included possessions in Italy, the Spanish Netherlands, the Philippines and the Americas, and though no longer the dominant great power, it remained largely intact. Since the Spanish refused to allow their Empire to be divided and its acquisition by either the Austrian Habsburgs or French Bourbons would change the balance of power, its inheritance led to a war that involved most of Europe. The 1700–1721 Great Northern War is considered a connected conflict, since it affected the involvement of states such as Sweden, Saxony, Denmark–Norway and Russia.

During the 1688–1697 Nine Years' War, armies grew from an average of 25,000 in 1648 to over 100,000 by 1697, which required a level of expenditure unsustainable for pre-industrial economies. The 1690s also marked the lowest point of the Little Ice Age, a period of cold and wet weather that drastically reduced crop yields across Europe. The Great Famine of 1695–1697 killed an estimated 15–25% of the population in present-day Scotland, Scandinavia and the Baltic states, plus another two million in France and Northern Italy. The 1697 Treaty of Ryswick was the result of mutual exhaustion and the acceptance by Louis that France could no longer achieve its objectives without allies. Since the question of the succession was left unresolved, Leopold signed the treaty with extreme reluctance in October 1697, by which time it was clear Charles would die childless and a resumption of hostilities appeared inevitable.

Partition treaties

Unlike the crowns of France or Austria, that of Spain could be inherited through the female line. This allowed Charles' sisters Maria Theresa (1638–1683) and Margaret Theresa (1651–1673) to pass their rights onto the children of their respective marriages with Louis XIV and Emperor Leopold. Louis sought to avoid conflict over the issue through direct negotiation with his main opponent William III of England, while excluding the Spanish.

Maria Antonia (1669–1692), daughter of Leopold and Margaret, married Maximillian Emanuel of Bavaria in 1685, and on 28 October 1692, they had a son, Joseph Ferdinand. Under the October 1698 Treaty of the Hague between France, Britain and the Dutch Republic, five-year old Joseph was designated heir to Charles II; in return, France and Austria would receive parts of Spain's European territories. Charles refused to accept this; on 14 November 1698, he published a will leaving an undivided Spanish monarchy to Joseph Ferdinand. However, the latter's death from smallpox in February 1699 undid these arrangements.

In 1685, Maria Antonia passed her claim to the Spanish throne onto Leopold's sons, Joseph and Archduke Charles. Her right to do so was doubtful, but Louis and William used this to devise the 1700 Treaty of London. Archduke Charles became the new heir, while France, Savoy and Austria received territorial compensation; however, since neither Leopold or Charles agreed, the treaty was largely pointless. By early October 1700, Charles was clearly dying; his final will left the throne to Louis XIV's grandson Philip, Duke of Anjou; if he refused, the offer would pass to his younger brother the Duke of Berry, followed by Archduke Charles.

Charles died on 1 November 1700, and on the 9th, Spanish ambassadors formally offered the throne to Philip. Louis briefly considered refusing; although it meant the succession of Archduke Charles, insisting William help him enforce the Treaty of London meant he might achieve his territorial aims without fighting. However, his son the Dauphin rejected the idea; French diplomats also advised Austria would fight regardless, while neither the British or Dutch would go to war for a settlement intended to avoid war. Louis therefore accepted on behalf of his grandson, who was proclaimed Philip V of Spain on 16 November 1700.

Prelude to war

With most of his objectives achieved by diplomacy, Louis now made a series of moves that combined to make war inevitable. The Tory majority in the English Parliament objected to the Partition Treaties, chiefly the French acquisition of Sicily, an important link in the lucrative Levant trade. However, a foreign diplomat observed their refusal to become involved in a European war was true "only so long as English commerce does not suffer". Louis either failed to appreciate this or decided to ignore it and his actions gradually eroded Tory opposition.

In early 1701, Louis registered Philip's claim to the French throne with the Paris Parlement, raising the possibility of union with Spain, contrary to Charles' will, though Philip was only third in the French succession. In February, the Spanish-controlled Duchies of Milan and Mantua in Northern Italy announced their support for Philip and accepted French troops. Combined with efforts to build an alliance between France and Imperial German states in Swabia and Franconia, these were challenges Leopold could not ignore.

Helped by the Viceroy, Max Emanuel of Bavaria, French troops replaced Dutch garrisons in the 'Barrier' fortresses in the Spanish Netherlands, granted at Ryswick. It also threatened the Dutch monopoly over the Scheldt granted by the 1648 Peace of Münster, while French control of Antwerp and Ostend would allow them to blockade the English Channel at will. Combined with other French actions that threatened English trade, this produced a clear majority for war and in May 1701, Parliament urged William to negotiate an anti-French alliance.

On 7 September, Leopold, the Dutch Republic and Britain signed the Treaty of The Hague renewing the 1689 Grand Alliance. Its provisions included securing the Dutch Barrier in the Spanish Netherlands, the Protestant succession in England and Scotland and an independent Spain but did not refer to placing Archduke Charles on the Spanish throne. When the exiled James II of England died on 16 September 1701, Louis reneged on his recognition of the Protestant William III as king of England and Scotland and supported the claim of James' son, James Francis Edward Stuart. War became inevitable and when William himself died in March 1702, his successor Queen Anne confirmed her support for the Treaty of the Hague. The Dutch now led by Grand Pensionary Anthonie Heinsius did the same, despite French hopes that without a Stadtholder the Republic would be torn apart internally. On 8 May the Dutch Republic declared war on France, followed by the British and the Emperor on 15 May and the Imperial Diet on 30 September.

General strategic drivers

The importance of trade and economic interests to the participants is often underestimated; contemporaries viewed Dutch and English support for the Habsburg cause as primarily driven by a desire for access to Spanish markets in the Americas. Modern economists generally assume a constantly growing market, but the then dominant theory of Mercantilism viewed it as relatively static. Increasing one's share implied taking it from someone else, and the role of the state was to restrict foreign competition by attacking merchant ships and colonies.

This expanded the war to North America, India, and other parts of Asia, with tariffs used as a policy weapon. From 1690 to 1704, English import duties on foreign goods increased by 400%, and the 1651–1663 Navigation Acts were a major factor in the Anglo-Dutch Wars. On 6 September 1700, France banned the import of English manufactured goods such as cloth, and imposed prohibitive duties on a wide range of others.

Armies of the Nine Years' War often exceeded 100,000 men, levels unsustainable for pre-industrial economies; those of 1701–1714 averaged around 35,000 to 50,000. Dependence on water-borne transport for supplying these numbers meant campaigns were focused on rivers like the Rhine and Adda, which limited operations in poor areas like Northern Spain. Better logistics, unified command, and simpler internal lines of communication gave Bourbon armies an advantage over their opponents.

Strategic objectives by participant

Great Britain

British foreign policy was based on three general principles, which remained largely consistent from the 16th through the 20th centuries. The first, overriding all others, was to preserve a balance of power in Europe, an objective threatened by French expansion under Louis XIV. The second was to prevent the Low Countries being controlled by a hostile power or one stronger than Britain; this included both the Spanish Netherlands and the Dutch Republic, whose deep harbours and prevailing winds made her a natural embarkation point for an attack on England, as demonstrated in 1688. The third was to maintain a navy strong enough to protect British trade, control her waters and launch attacks on her enemies' commercial routes and coastal areas.

Alignment on reducing the power of France and securing the Protestant succession for the British throne masked differences on how to achieve them. In general, the Tories favoured a mercantilist strategy of using the Royal Navy to attack French and Spanish trade while protecting and expanding their own; land commitments were viewed as expensive and primarily of benefit to others. The Whigs argued France could not be defeated by seapower alone, making a Continental strategy essential, while Britain's financial strength made it the only member of the Alliance able to operate on all fronts against France.

Dutch Republic
Although the English Duke of Marlborough was Allied commander in the Low Countries, the Dutch provided much of the manpower, and strategy in this theatre was subject to their approval. The 1672 to 1678 Franco-Dutch War showed the Spanish could not defend the Southern Netherlands, and so the 1697 Treaty of Ryswick allowed the Dutch to place garrisons in eight key cities. They hoped this barrier would provide the strategic depth needed to protect their commercial and demographic heartlands around Amsterdam against attack from the south. However, with the help of Maximilian of Bavaria, the governor of the Spanish Netherlands, the Dutch garrison troops had been replaced by French troops by 1701. Dutch priorities were to re-establish and strengthen the Barrier fortresses, retain control of the economically vital Scheldt estuary, and gain access to trade in the Spanish Empire.

Austria and the Holy Roman Empire

Despite being the dominant power within the Holy Roman Empire, Austrian and Imperial interests did not always coincide. The Habsburgs wanted to put Archduke Charles on the throne of an undivided Spanish Monarchy, while their Allies were fighting to prevent either the Bourbons or the Habsburgs from doing so. This divergence and Austria's financial collapse in 1703 meant the campaign in Spain was reliant on Anglo-Dutch naval support and after 1706, British funding. Particularly during the reign of Joseph I, the priority for the Habsburgs was to secure their southern borders from French intervention in northern Italy and suppress Rákóczi's War of Independence in Hungary.

Much of the Spanish nobility resented what they considered to be the arrogance of the Austrians, a key factor in the selection of Philip as their preferred candidate in 1700. In return for British support, Charles agreed to major commercial concessions within the Empire, as well as accepting British control of Gibraltar and Menorca. These made him widely unpopular at all levels of Spanish society, and he was never able to sustain himself outside the coastal regions, which could be supplied by the Royal Navy. 

The Wittelsbach-controlled states of Bavaria, Liège, and Cologne allied with France, but the vast majority of the Empire remained neutral, or limited their involvement to the supply of mercenaries. Like Bavaria, the larger entities pursued their own policies; his claim to the Polish crown meant Augustus of Saxony focused on the Great Northern War, while Frederick I made his support dependent on Leopold recognising Prussia as a kingdom and making it an equal member of the Grand Alliance. Since George, Elector Hanover, was also heir to the British throne, his support was more reliable, but the suspicion remained the interests of Hanover came first.

France
Under Louis XIV, France was the most powerful state in Europe, with revenue-generating capacities that far exceeded those of its rivals. Its geographical position provided enormous tactical flexibility; unlike Austria, it had a navy, and as the campaigns of 1708–1710 proved, even under severe pressure it could defend its borders. The Nine Years' War had shown France could not impose its objectives without support but the alliance with Spain and Bavaria made a successful outcome far more likely. Apart from denying an undivided Spanish Monarchy to others, Louis's objectives were to secure his borders with the Holy Roman Empire, weaken his rival Austria, and increase French commercial strength through access to trade with the Americas.

Spain

In 1700, Spain remained a great power in terms of territory controlled, while recent research shows imports of bullion from the Americas actually reached their highest level between 1670 and 1700. However, this concealed major structural weaknesses; the vast majority of these imports were used to fund debt or pay foreign merchants. When the new Bourbon administration took over in 1701, they found the Empire bankrupt and effectively defenceless, with fewer than 15,000 troops in Spain itself and a navy consisting of 20 ships in total.

Almost constant warfare during the 17th century made the economy subject to long periods of low productivity and depression, and largely reliant upon others for its prosperity. In many ways, the continued existence of the Empire was not due to Spanish strength but to maintain a balance between the powers competing for a share of its markets. Despite fighting a series of wars against Spain from 1667 to 1697, France was also its most significant economic partner, supplying labour and controlling a large proportion of its foreign trade. This consideration was an important factor in the decision to name Philip heir. Its dependence on others was illustrated in 1703; despite the presence of an invading Allied army, the French ambassador urged Louis to allow Dutch and English merchants to purchase wool from Spanish farmers, "otherwise the flocks cannot be maintained".

Enacting political or economic reform was extremely complex since Habsburg Spain was a personal union between the Crowns of Castile and Aragon, each with very different political cultures. Most of Philip's support came from the Castilian elite. The Spanish Netherlands had been governed by Bavaria since 1690, while links with Italy, traditionally the major source of Spanish recruits and funding, had been weakened by decades of neglect and heavy taxation. It was widely, if reluctantly, accepted in Madrid that preserving an independent Spanish empire required comprehensive reforms, including elimination of the privileges or Fueros held by the Aragonese states. It was no coincidence Archduke Charles had strong support in areas which were part of the Crown of Aragon, including Catalonia and Valencia.

Savoy

Over the course of the 17th century, the Savoyard state, generally known as Savoy, sought to replace Spain as the dominant power in Northern Italy. Savoy consisted of two main geographic segments; Piedmont, which contained the capital Turin, and the Duchy of Aosta on the Italian side of the Alps, with the Duchy of Savoy and County of Nice in Transalpine France. The latter were almost impossible to defend and combined with the anti-Habsburg policy pursued by Louis XIV and his predecessors, this meant Savoy generally sided with France. However, Piedmont provided foreign powers access to the restive southern French provinces of the Dauphiné and Vaunage, former Huguenot strongholds with a long history of rebellion. This provided Victor Amadeus II with a degree of leverage, allowing him to manoeuvre between opposing parties in order to expand his territories.

During the Nine Years' War in 1690, Savoy joined the Grand Alliance before agreeing a separate peace with France in 1696. The accession of Philip V in 1701 led to a reversal of long-standing strategic policy, with France now supporting the Spanish position in Lombardy, rather than seeking to weaken it, and Austria doing the opposite. While Victor Amadeus initially allied Savoy with France, his long-term goal was the acquisition of the Duchy of Milan, which neither Bourbons nor Habsburgs would relinquish voluntarily. In fact, as discussed elsewhere in this article, securing his borders in Italy was of greater concern to Emperor Leopold than Spain itself. This meant Britain was the only power inclined to help Victor Amadeus achieve this objective and he changed sides in 1703 after the Royal Navy won control of the Western Mediterranean.

Military campaigns; 1701–1708

Italy

The war in Italy primarily involved the Spanish-ruled Duchies of Milan and Mantua, considered essential to the security of Austria's southern borders. In 1701, French troops occupied both cities and Victor Amadeus II, Duke of Savoy, allied with France, his daughter Maria Luisa marrying Philip V. In May 1701, an Imperial army under Prince Eugene of Savoy moved into Northern Italy; by February 1702, victories at Carpi, Chiari and Cremona forced the French behind the Adda river.

Vendôme, one of the best French generals, took command and was substantially reinforced; Prince Eugene managed a draw at the Battle of Luzzara but the French recovered most of the territory lost the year before. In October 1703, Victor Amadeus declared war on France; by May 1706, the French held most of Savoy except Turin while victories at Cassano and Calcinato forced the Imperialists into the Trentino valley.

However, in July 1706 Vendôme and any available forces were sent to reinforce France's northern frontier after the defeat at Ramillies. Reinforced by German auxiliaries led by Leopold of Anhalt-Dessau, Prince Eugene broke the Siege of Turin in September; despite a minor French victory at Castiglione, the war in Italy was over. To the fury of his allies, in the March 1707 Convention of Milan Emperor Joseph gave French troops in Lombardy free passage to Southern France.

A combined Savoyard-Imperial attack on the French base of Toulon planned for April was postponed when Imperial troops were diverted to seize the Spanish Bourbon Kingdom of Naples. By the time they besieged Toulon in August, the French were too strong, and they were forced to withdraw. By the end of 1707, fighting in Italy ceased, apart from small-scale attempts by Victor Amadeus to recover Nice and Savoy.

Low Countries, Rhine and Danube

The first objective for the Grand Alliance in this theatre was to secure the Dutch frontiers, threatened by the alliance between France, Bavaria, and Joseph Clemens of Bavaria, ruler of Liège and Cologne. During 1702, the Grand Alliance repelled an assault on Nijmegen, captured Kaiserswerth, a strong town on the eastern side of the Dutch Republic, and retook a few of the Barrier fortresses along with Venlo, Roermond and Liège. The 1703 campaign was marred by Allied conflicts over strategy; they failed to take Antwerp, and the Dutch narrowly escaped  disaster at Ekeren in June, which led to bitter recriminations.

On the Upper Rhine, Imperial forces under Louis of Baden remained on the defensive, although they took Landau in 1702. Throughout 1703, French victories at Friedlingen, Höchstädt and Speyerbach with the capture of Kehl, Breisach and Landau directly threatened Vienna.

In 1704, Franco-Bavarian forces continued their advance with the Austrians struggling to suppress Rákóczi's revolt in Hungary. To relieve the pressure, Marlborough marched up the Rhine, joined forces with Louis of Baden and Prince Eugene, and crossed the Danube on 2 July. Allied victory at Blenheim on 13 August forced Bavaria out of the war and the Treaty of Ilbersheim placed it under Austrian rule.

Allied efforts to exploit their victory in 1705 foundered on poor co-ordination, tactical disputes and command rivalries, while the ruthless rule of Leopold's successor Joseph in Bavaria caused a brief but vicious peasant revolt. In May 1706, an Allied force under Marlborough shattered a French army at the Battle of Ramillies and the Spanish Netherlands fell to the Allies in under two weeks. France assumed a defensive posture for the rest of the war; despite the loss of strongpoints like Lille, they prevented the Allies from making a decisive breach in their frontiers. By 1712, the overall position remained largely unchanged from 1706.

Spain and Portugal

British involvement was driven by safeguarding their trade routes in the Mediterranean. By putting Charles VI on the Spanish throne, they also hoped to gain commercial privileges within the Spanish Empire. The Habsburgs viewed Northern Italy, as well as suppressing the Hungarian revolt, as higher priorities, while, after 1704, the Dutch focused on Flanders. As a result, this theatre was largely dependent on British naval and military support; high casualties from disease made it a heavy drain on resources for little apparent benefit.

Spain was a union between the Crowns of Castile and Aragon, which was divided into the Principality of Catalonia, plus the Kingdoms of Aragon, Valencia, Majorca, Sicily, Naples and Sardinia. In 1701, Majorca, Naples, Sicily, and Sardinia declared for Philip, while a mixture of anti-Castilian and anti-French sentiment meant the others supported Archduke Charles, the most important being Catalonia. Allied victory at Vigo Bay in October 1702 persuaded Peter II of Portugal to switch sides, giving them an operational base in this area.

Archduke Charles landed at Lisbon in March 1704 to begin a land campaign, while the British-Dutch capture of Gibraltar was a significant blow to Bourbon prestige. An attempt to retake it was defeated in August, with a land siege being abandoned in April 1705. The 1705 Pact of Genoa between Catalan representatives and Britain opened a second front in the north-east; the loss of Barcelona and Valencia left Toulon as the only major port available to the Bourbons in the Western Mediterranean. Philip tried to retake Barcelona in May 1706 but was repulsed, while his absence allowed an Allied force from Portugal to enter Madrid and Saragossa.

However, lack of popular support and logistical issues meant the Allies could not hold territory away from the coastline, and by November, Philip controlled Castile, Murcia, and parts of Valencia. Allied efforts to regain the initiative ended with defeat at Almansa in April 1707, followed by failure to take Toulon in August. The capture of Menorca in 1708, combined with possession of Gibraltar, gave the British control of the Western Mediterranean, which many considered their primary objective.

War beyond Europe and related conflicts

The close links between war and trade meant conflict extended beyond Europe, particularly in North America, where it is known as Queen Anne's War, and the West Indies, which produced sugar, then a hugely profitable commodity. Also, there were minor trade conflicts in South America, India, and Asia; the financial strains of war particularly affected the Dutch East India Company, as it was a huge drain on scarce naval resources.

Related conflicts include Rákóczi's War of Independence in Hungary, which was funded by France and a serious concern for the Habsburgs throughout the war. In South-Eastern France, Britain funded the Huguenot 1704–1710 Camisard rebellion; one objective of the 1707 campaign in Northern Italy and Southern France was to support this revolt, one of a series that began in the 1620s.

Towards peace; 1709–1715 
By the end of 1708, the French had withdrawn from Northern Italy, while the Maritime Powers controlled the Spanish Netherlands, and secured the borders of the Dutch Republic; in the Mediterranean, the Maritime Powers had achieved naval supremacy, and Britain acquired permanent bases in Gibraltar and Menorca. However, as Marlborough himself pointed out, the French frontiers remained largely intact, their army showed no signs of being defeated, while Philip proved far more popular with the Spanish than his rival. Many of the objectives set out by the Grand Alliance in 1701 had been achieved, but success in 1708 made them overconfident.

Diplomacy

French diplomats focused on the Dutch, whom they considered were more likely to favour peace than their allies since victory at Ramillies removed any direct military threat to the Republic, while highlighting differences with Britain on the Spanish Netherlands. Peace talks broke down in late 1708 because the Allies had agreed not to negotiate a separate peace but could not agree on the terms. The Great Frost of 1709 caused widespread famine in France and Spain, forcing Louis to re-open negotiations and in May 1709 the Allies presented him with the preliminaries of the Hague. Philip was given two months to cede his throne to Archduke Charles, while France was required to remove him by force if he did not comply.

Many Allied statesmen, including Marlborough, felt the terms seriously underestimated France's ability to continue the war and assumed Philip would abdicate on request. They also required the Spanish to accept Archduke Charles as king in his place, which they were clearly unwilling to do, as demonstrated by the failure of Allied campaigns to hold territory outside Catalonia. Although Louis was willing to abandon his ambitions in Spain, making war on his grandson was unacceptable, a stipulation so offensive that when made public the French resolved to fight on.

Marlborough's 1709 offensive in Northern France culminated in the Battle of Malplaquet on 11 September; a narrow Allied victory, total casualties were around 24,500 out of 86,000, the Dutch infantry losing 8,500 out of 18,000. Although the French strategic position continued to deteriorate, it showed their fighting abilities remained intact and increased war-weariness in both Britain and the Dutch Republic. More significant were Franco-Spanish victories at Alicante in April, and La Gudina in May 1709, which meant a successful military solution now appeared remote.

Shortly after, the Dutch discovered they had been excluded from a commercial agreement signed by Archduke Charles which granted Britain exclusive trading rights in Spanish America. This deepened divisions between the Allies, while increasing Spanish opposition to having the Archduke as their king. When the Whig government in London tried to compensate the Dutch by agreeing concessions in the Spanish Netherlands, they were opposed by their Tory opponents as detrimental to British commerce.

The Whigs had won the 1708 British general election by arguing military victory was the quickest road to peace, but failure in France was mirrored in Spain. Archduke Charles re-entered Madrid in 1710 after victories in the Battle of Almenar and Battle of Saragossa, but the Allies could not hold the interior and were forced to retreat. 3,500 British troops surrendered at Brihuega on 8 December, and the Battle of Villaviciosa on 10 December confirmed Bourbon control of Spain. At the same time, costs continued to spiral; the Dutch were close to bankruptcy while Austrian troops were almost entirely funded by Britain. In 1709, Parliament approved expenditures of £6.4 million, up from £5.0 million in 1706; by the end of 1710, these had nearly doubled to £12.9 million, despite minimal gains.

Negotiations

When negotiations resumed in March 1710 at Geertruidenberg, it was clear to the French the mood in Britain had changed. This was confirmed when the pro-peace Tories won a landslide victory in the October 1710 British general election, although they confirmed their commitment to the war to prevent a credit crisis. Despite the capture of Bouchain in September, a decisive victory in Northern France continued to elude the Allies, and an expedition against Quebec in French North America ended in disaster.

When Emperor Joseph died in April 1711, Archduke Charles was elected Emperor; continuing the war now seemed pointless since the union of Spain with Austria was as unwelcome as one with France. The British secretly negotiated peace terms directly with France, leading to the signing of the Preliminary Articles of London on 8 October 1711. Despite their resentment at being excluded from these negotiations, the Dutch were financially exhausted by the enormous cost of the war, and could not continue without British support. Charles VI initially rejected the idea of a peace conference; he reluctantly agreed once the Dutch decided to support it, but Habsburg opposition to the treaty continued.

Peace of Utrecht

Within weeks of the conference opening, events threatened the basis of the peace agreed between Britain and France. First, the French presented proposals awarding the Spanish Netherlands to Max Emmanuel of Bavaria and a minimal Barrier, leaving the Dutch with little to show for their huge investment of money and men. Second, a series of deaths left Louis XIV's two-year-old great-grandson, the future Louis XV as heir, making Philip next in line and his immediate renunciation imperative.

The Dutch and Austrians fought on, hoping to improve their negotiating position but Bolingbroke issued 'Restraining Orders' to Marlborough's replacement, the Duke of Ormonde, instructing him not to participate in offensive operations against the French. These orders caused fury then and later, with Whigs urging Hanoverian military intervention; those George considered responsible, including Ormonde and Bolingbroke were driven into exile after his succession, and became prominent Jacobites.

Prince Eugene captured Le Quesnoy in June and besieged Landrecies but was defeated at Denain on 24 July; the French went on to recapture Le Quesnoy and many towns lost in previous years, including Marchines, Douai, and Bouchain. This showed the French retained their fighting ability, while the Dutch finally reached the end of their willingness and ability to continue the war.

On 6 June, Philip confirmed his renunciation of the French throne, and the British offered the Dutch a revised Barrier Treaty, replacing that of 1709 which they rejected as overly generous. A significant improvement on the 1697 Barrier, it was subject to Austrian approval; although the final terms were less beneficial, it was sufficient for the Dutch to agree peace terms.

Charles withdrew from the Conference when France insisted he guarantee not to acquire Mantua or Mirandola; he was supported in this by George, Elector of Hanover, who wanted France to withdraw support for the Stuart heir James Francis. As a result, neither Austria nor the Empire signed the Treaty of Utrecht of 11 April 1713 between France and the other Allies; Spain made peace with the Dutch in June, then Savoy and Britain on 13 July 1713.

Treaties of Rastatt and Baden
Fighting continued on the Rhine, but Austria was financially exhausted, and after the loss of Landau and Freiburg in November 1713, Charles finally made peace on 7 March 1714. In the Treaty of Rastatt, the Habsburg monarchy acceded to the terms of Utrecht, which confirmed their gains in Southern Italy, returned Breisach, Kehl, and Freiburg, ended French support for the Hungarian revolt and agreed on terms for the Dutch Barrier fortresses. Charles abandoned his claim to Strasbourg and Alsace and agreed to the restoration of the Wittelsbach Electors of Bavaria and Cologne, Max Emmanuel, and Joseph Clemens. Article XIX of the treaty transferred sovereignty over the Spanish Netherlands to Austria. On 7 September, the Holy Roman Empire joined the agreement by the Treaty of Baden; although Catalonia and Majorca were not finally subdued by the Bourbons until June 1715, the war was over.

Aftermath

Article II of the Peace of Utrecht included the stipulation "because of the great danger which threatened the liberty and safety of all Europe, from the too-close conjunction of the kingdoms of Spain and France, ... the same person should never become King of both kingdoms." Some historians view this as a key point in the evolution of the modern nation-state; Randall Lesaffer argues it marks a significant milestone in the concept of collective security.

Britain is usually seen as the main beneficiary of Utrecht, which marked its rise to becoming the dominant European commercial power. It established naval superiority over its competitors, acquired the strategic Mediterranean ports of Gibraltar and Menorca and trading rights in Spanish America. France accepted the Protestant succession, ensuring a smooth inheritance by George I in August 1714, while agreeing to end support for the Stuarts in the 1716 Anglo-French Treaty. Although the war left all participants with unprecedented levels of government debt, only Britain was able to finance it efficiently, providing a relative advantage over its competitors.

Philip was confirmed as King of Spain, which retained its independence and the majority of its empire, in return for ceding the Spanish Netherlands, most of their Italian possessions, as well as Gibraltar and Menorca. These losses were deeply felt; Naples and Sicily were regained in 1735 and Menorca in 1782, although Gibraltar is still held by Britain, despite numerous attempts to regain it. The 1707  decrees centralised power in Madrid, and abolished regional political structures, although Catalonia and Majorca remained outside the system until 1767. Their economy recovered remarkably quickly, while the House of Bourbon still holds the Spanish throne.

Despite failure in Spain, Austria secured its position in Italy and Hungary and acquired the bulk of the Spanish Netherlands; even after reimbursing the Dutch for the cost of their Barrier garrisons, the increased revenues funded a significant expansion of the Austrian army. The shift of Habsburg focus away from Germany and into Southern Europe continued with victory in the Austro-Turkish War of 1716–1718. Their position as the dominant power within the Holy Roman Empire was challenged by Bavaria, Hanover, Prussia, and Saxony, who increasingly acted as independent powers; in 1742, Charles of Bavaria became the first non-Habsburg Emperor in over 300 years.

The Dutch had successfully defended their positions in the Southern Netherlands, and their troops were central to the alliance which halted French territorial expansion in Europe until a new cycle began in 1792. However, the war left them effectively bankrupt, and inflicted permanent damage on the Dutch merchant navy; while they remained the dominant economic power in the Far East, Britain took over as the pre-eminent global commercial and maritime power. The Barrier Treaty fortresses became the central driver of Dutch foreign policy in the decades after 1713, but although judged favourably by contemporaries, modern historians still argue about their effectiveness, since the forts were conquered by France during the War of the Austrian Succession. 

Louis XIV died on 1 September 1715, and was succeeded by his five-year-old great-grandson Louis XV; on his deathbed, he is alleged to have admitted, "I have loved war too well". True or not, while the final settlement was far more favourable than the Allied terms of 1709, it is hard to see what Louis gained he had not already achieved through diplomacy by February 1701. Since 1666, French policies assumed military and economic superiority over their rivals, but this was no longer the case by 1714 when Britain appeared to have overtaken France on both fronts. The continued widening of this gap as British trade expanded post-Utrecht was viewed by Louis' successors as a permanent threat to the European balance of power. Seeking to reduce this was a major factor in France entering the 1740 to 1748 War of the Austrian Succession.

Wider implications include the rise of Prussia and Savoy while many of the participants were involved in the 1700–1721 Great Northern War, with Russia becoming a major European power for the first time as a result. Finally, while colonial conflicts were relatively minor and largely confined to the North American theatre, the so-called Queen Anne's War, they were to become a key element in future wars. Meanwhile, maritime unemployment brought on by the war's end led to the third stage of the Golden Age of Piracy, as many sailors formerly employed in the navies of the warring powers turned to piracy for survival.

Claims to the Spanish throne

Explanatory notes

References

Sources

 
 
 
 
 
 
 
 
 
 
 
 
 
 
 
 
 
 
 
 
 
 
 
 
 
 
 
 
 
 
 
 
 
 
 
 
 
 
 
 
 
 Navarro i Soriano, Ferran (2019). Harca, harca, harca! Músiques per a la recreació històrica de la Guerra de Successió (1794–1715). Editorial DENES.

Further reading

External links
 

 
1700s conflicts
1700s in Austria
1700s in France
1700s in Italy
1700s in Spain
1700s in the Caribbean
1710s conflicts
1710s in Austria
1710s in France
1710s in Italy
1710s in Spain
1710s in the Caribbean
Anglo-French wars
Global conflicts
History of the Royal Marines
Pretenders to the Spanish throne
Wars of succession involving the states and peoples of Africa
Wars of succession involving the states and peoples of Asia
Wars of succession involving the states and peoples of Europe
Wars of succession involving the states and peoples of North America